Bonabes Louis Victurnien, Marquess of Rougé, Peer of France, (31 January 1778 Paris – 29 March 1839 Paris) was a French military officer and statesman.

In 1794, he entered the service of Austria as aide-de-camp to the Prince von Waldeck. The same year he joined the Mortemart regiment (of his uncle the Duke de Mortemart of the French émigré army.

With the restoration of the House of Bourbon, he was appointed Adjutant-Major of the King's Swiss Guards, and he received the cross of the military order of Saint Louis. During the Hundred Days, he followed Louis XVIII into exile; as a reward, he was later promoted to the rank of Lieutenant Commander of the French Column of the Royal Swiss. In 1815, he was raised to the Hereditary Peerage with the title of Marquis. He later refused to swear allegiance to Louis Philippe and resigned his commission in 1830.

He died on March 30, 1838, at the age of sixty.

Family 
On 17 April 1804, he married Celestine de Crussol d'Uzes, daughter of the Duc d'Uzes, first peer of France, and of Amable Emilie de Châtillon; they had six children:
Aldéric, Comte de Rougé (1805-1805)
Théodorite, Marquis de Rougé (1806–1864)
Victurnienne de Rougé (1806–1879)
Hervé de Rougé, Marquis du Plessis-Bellière (1809–1888)
Louis-Bonabes, Comte de Rougé (1813–1880)
Marie-Thérèse de Rougé (1817–1841)

References

1778 births
1839 deaths
French military personnel
Marquesses of Rougé
Barons of Coëtmen
Barons of Montfaucon
Order of Saint Louis recipients
Peers of France